The 1900–01 season was the 28th Scottish football season in which Dumbarton competed at national level entering the Scottish Cup and the Scottish Qualifying Cup.  In addition Dumbarton played in the Dumbartonshire Cup.

Scottish Qualifying Cup
Qualification for the Scottish Cup was gained by reaching the fifth round of the Scottish Qualifying Cup before losing out to East Stirling.

Scottish Cup

Dumbarton were no match for First Division opponents Hibernian in the first round of the Scottish Cup.

Dumbartonshire Cup
The Dumbartonshire Cup was again played on a league basis.  Only three teams entered and after the first stage, Vale of Leven topped the league. Dumbarton beat Renton in the semi final but lost out to 'Vale' in the final.

Friendlies
Another season without league football saw fixtures and attendances fall away badly.

A meagre 6 'friendly' matches were played during the season, with even a match against Celtic attracting fewer than 1,000 spectators.  In all 2 were won and 4 lost, scoring 12 goals and conceding 15.

At the end of the season an AGM proposal to disband the club was accepted, so just 10 years after being crowned as Scottish league champions Dumbarton F.C. went out of existence, and would not re-appear again until August 1905.

Player statistics

|}

Source:

Reserve team
Dumbarton lost in the second round of the Scottish Second XI Cup to Queen's Park.

References

Dumbarton F.C. seasons
Scottish football clubs 1900–01 season